The Flowers of Romance may refer to:
 "The Flowers of Romance" (song), a song by Sex Pistols
 "Flowers of Romance" (song), a 1980 song by Public Image Ltd
 The Flowers of Romance (British band), an early British punk rock band
 The Flowers of Romance (album), a 1981 album by Public Image Ltd
 The Flowers of Romance (Greek band), a Greek gothic rock band
 Vennaskond, an Estonian punk band who sometimes performs under the name of "The Flowers of Romance"
 A manga by Atsushi Kamijo